William August Bartholomae, Jr. (January 23, 1893 – January 5, 1964) was an American sailor and oil tycoon. He competed in the mixed 6 metres at the 1936 Summer Olympics. Bartholomae, the stepfather of fellow competitor Carl Paul, was stabbed to death by Manola Gallardo, the sister of his sister-in-law Mrs. Charles Bartholomae in 1964.

References

1893 births
1964 deaths
Sportspeople from Los Angeles
Olympic sailors of the United States
Sailors at the 1936 Summer Olympics – 6 Metre
20th-century American businesspeople
American businesspeople in the oil industry
Deaths by stabbing in California
1964 murders in the United States
Male murder victims